John Boles may refer to:

John Boles (actor) (1895–1969), American actor
John Boles (baseball) (born 1948), American baseball executive
John Boles (sport shooter) (1888–1952), American sports shooter
John B. Boles (born 1943), American historian
John Patrick Boles (1930–2014), American Roman Catholic bishop

See also
John Bole (disambiguation)